Cricket Lee (born March 17, 1953 in Decatur, Alabama) is an American entrepreneur and inventor notable for created a clothes fitting standard called Fitlogic, designed to include size and three body types for US women, and founding the company Fit Technologies to market the standard.

Notes

References 

1953 births
Living people
Women inventors
People from Decatur, Alabama
21st-century American inventors